De Winton's golden mole (Cryptochloris wintoni) is a species of mammal in the family Chrysochloridae. It is endemic to South Africa. Its natural habitats are subtropical dry shrubland, Mediterranean-type shrubby vegetation, and sandy shores. It is threatened by habitat destruction. It is "critically endangered" and may be extinct.

Searches for evidence of the mole continued existence are still ongoing as of 2021, and the species is considered a "top 25 most wanted" missing species by conservation group Re:Wild.

Description
De Winton's golden mole resembles Grant's golden mole (Eremitalpa granti) in appearance. The upper parts have short dense fur that is slate-grey with a yellowish tinge. Individual hairs have grey bases, whitish shafts and fawn tips. The face, cheeks and lips have a more intense yellowish tinge. The underparts are rather paler than the upper parts, individual hairs having white tips. Claw two is slightly shorter and claw one shorter still, making a pointed digging tool.

Status
De Winton's golden mole is known from a single location and has not been seen for fifty years. It occupies the same range as Grant's golden mole and the two may have been confused. However, phylogenetic evidence indicates that they are different species, based on differences in the skull, the shape of the malleus and the number of vertebrae. The type location is Port Nolloth, and this mole's habitat is coastal sand dunes and nearby sandy areas. Mining for diamonds near Port Nolloth may be a threat to this species. The International Union for Conservation of Nature now rates this species as "critically endangered", and it may be extinct. De Winton's golden mole is among the 25 “most wanted lost” species that are the focus of Re:wild's “Search for Lost Species” initiative.

References

Afrosoricida
Endemic fauna of South Africa
Mammals of South Africa
Critically endangered fauna of Africa
Taxonomy articles created by Polbot
Mammals described in 1907